Peter D. Norton (born 1963), often just Peter Norton, is a U.S. historian, academic and author, known for a critical view of societies' relationship with the private car. Norton has written about the history of the car, from a societal U.S. perspective, describing in depth how different groups, like store owners, traffic engineers, the police, pedestrians and newspapers viewed the advent of the car in the early 20th century. He shows that there was considerable resistance to the increasing dominance of cars, not least in the cities. Furthermore he studies which viewpoint they came from. One conclusion is that the automobile industry seem to have won by appealing to freedom, as their prime argument.

Norton holds a position as an associate professor at the University of Virginia. He has received prizes for teaching as well as the Abbot Payson Usher Prize of the Society for the History of Technology for "the best scholarly work published during the preceding three years under the auspices of the Society for the History of Technology".

His work has been covered in various articles.
The title of the 2021 article in the New York Times, Tech Can’t Fix the Problem of Cars - Flashy new car technology may be exciting, but it might also be distracting us from what we need, sums up Norton’s general position that cars are useful but that car dependency is dysfunctional and unsustainable.

Amongst his most cited writings are:
 Fighting traffic: the dawn of the motor age in the American city (2011)
 Street rivals: Jaywalking and the invention of the motor age street (2007) in the journal Technology and Culture

In 2021 Norton published the book, Autonorama: The Illusory Promise of High-Tech Driving. One of the primary messages of the book is this: The current campaign for autonomous cars as the major solution is very similar to earlier campaigns to increase support for a car-based society. For many decades in several waves, the car conglomorate has been selling "the next big thing" as a glorious solution to the public, media and politicians. The current campaign for autonmous cars can be viewed as a continuation of a recognisable strategy.

References

American male writers
Urban theorists
Historians of transport
Living people
1963 births